Suncoast Credit Union Arena is a  multipurpose arena on the campus of Florida SouthWestern State College (FSW) in Fort Myers, Florida.  It is the home of the FSW Buccaneers men's and women's basketball and volleyball teams.  It holds 3,500 people in basketball configuration.  It also features six skyboxes, a hospitality event center, competition courts that convert into recreational courts, athletic office space, student, faculty and staff wellness, and an athletic center with a fitness pavilion, men's and women's locker rooms and a weight training area.  It is also the home to the City of Palms Classic, an annual high school basketball tournament.

Suncoast Credit Union, a Tampa-based credit union with roots in serving educators, paid $5 million for the arena's naming rights.

Suncoast Credit Union Arena has hosted the Rocket Mortgage Fort Myers Tip-Off since it started in 2018. In 2020, the four team tournament included #1 ranked Gonzaga University and #6 ranked University of Kansas, as well as Auburn University and Saint Joseph's University.

References

External links
Facilities - Suncoast Credit Union Arena

Basketball venues in Florida
College basketball venues in the United States
Sports venues in Fort Myers, Florida
2016 establishments in Florida
Sports venues completed in 2016
College volleyball venues in the United States